Sir William Robert Cox, KCB (2 January 1922 – 27 June 1981) was a British civil servant. 

Cox attended Christ's College, Cambridge, before he entered HM Civil Service in 1941. He served in the Foreign Office before transferring to the Ministry of Town and Country Planning in 1950, which subsequently became the Ministry of Housing and Local Government. There he worked on regional planning and the reforms to the planning system of the 1960s. He was Director-General of HM Prison Service from 1970 to 1973 and then in 1974 became Deputy Chief Executive of the Property Services Agency (PSA). Later in 1974, he was appointed Chief Executive of the PSA and Second Permanent Secretary at the Department of the Environment, serving until his retirement on health grounds in 1981; he died on 27 June that year. He had been appointed a Knight Companion of the Order of the Bath in 1976.

References 

1922 births
1981 deaths
Alumni of Christ's College, Cambridge
Knights Companion of the Order of the Bath
Civil servants in the Foreign Office
Civil servants in the Ministry of Housing and Local Government
Civil servants in the Home Office
Civil servants in the Property Services Agency
Civil servants in the Department of the Environment
British Permanent Secretaries